GYG may refer to:

Global Young Greens, an emerging global organisation
Guzman y Gomez, Australian casual-dining restaurant chain